The cariñosa (meaning loving or affectionate) is a Philippine dance of colonial-era origin from the Maria Clara suite of Philippine folk dances, where the fan or handkerchief plays an instrumental role as it places the couple in a romance scenario.

History
The cariñosa originated in Panay Island and was introduced by the Spaniards during their colonization of the Philippines. It is related to some of the Spanish dances like the bolero and the Mexican dance jarabe tapatio or the Mexican hat dance.

Bicolano cariñosa
According to the book of Francisca Reyes-Aquino, Philippine Folk Dances, Volume 2, there is a different version of the cariñosa in the region of Bicol. Reyes-Aquino is a Filipino folk dancer and cultural researcher who discovered and documented Philippine Traditional dances such as the Cariñosa. In the Bicol Region cariñosa, hide and seek movement in different ways. In the original version, the dancers used the fan and handkerchief as the way to do the hide and seek movement, in Bicol they used two handkerchiefs holding the two corners of the handkerchief and doing the hide and seek movement as they point their foot forward and their hands go upward together with their handkerchiefs following the movement. It is a complicated step however it is still used in the Bicol Region during festivals and social gatherings.

Costume
Originally, the cariñosa was danced with María Clara gown and Barong Tagalog for it is a Spanish dance. In addition, Filipino wore the patadyong kimona and camisa de chino to reveal nationalism. (a native dress of the Tagalog regions), camisa (a white sleeve) or patadyong kimona (a dress of the Visayan people) and for boys, a barong Tagalog and colored pants.

Status as a Philippine national dance
The cariñosa is considered to be an official national dance of the Philippines, as no law has designated them as such. In 2014, House Representative Rene Relampagos introduced a bill in the House of Representatives to grant the cariñosa such a status, which did not become law.

References

National symbols of the Philippines
Dances of the Philippines